Jacoba Catharina "Coby" Sikkens (born 11 May 1946, in Groningen) is a retired Dutch backstroke swimmer who won a gold medal in 4 × 100 m medley at the 1966 European Aquatics Championships. She also participated in the 1968 Summer Olympics.

References

1946 births
Living people
Olympic swimmers of the Netherlands
Swimmers at the 1968 Summer Olympics
Dutch female backstroke swimmers
Sportspeople from Groningen (city)
European Aquatics Championships medalists in swimming
20th-century Dutch women
20th-century Dutch people